
Celina may refer to: Celina (given name), the origins of the name.

Places
 Celina, Indiana, an unincorporated community
 Celina, Minnesota, an unincorporated community
 Celina, Ohio, a city
 Celina, Tennessee, a city
 Celina, Texas, a city
 Čelina, Czech Republic, a village
 Čelina, Konjic, a village in Bosnia and Herzegovina
 Čelina, Croatia, a village near Omiš

People
Célena Cherry (born 1977), lead singer of the Honeyz
Celina González (1929–2015), Cuban singer and songwriter
Celina Jade (born 1985), actress
Celina Jaitly (born 1981), Indian actress
Celina Jesionowska (born 1933), Polish sprinter
Celina Seghi (born 1920), Italian former alpine skier
Celena Shafer (born c. 1975), American operatic soprano

Other uses
Celina (beetle), a genus of water beetle
Moderate Tropical Storm Celina, in the 2007–2008 South-West Indian Ocean cyclone season

See also
Celine
Selina
Selena (given name)
Tselina
Tselina (disambiguation)